The Mayor of Surat is the first citizen of the Indian city of Surat and is the head of the Surat Municipal Corporation. He is also the presiding authority of the General Board of the SMC. The Mayor is elected from among the elected councilors in its first meeting after elections. The position is currently held by Hemali Boghawala of the BJP.

Election 
The General Body of the SMC is formed by the elected members from each ward. There are 38 wards under the jurisdiction of SMC, which elect a total of 114 councilors. The first meeting of the General Body and the Standing Committee is called by the Municipal Commissioner of Surat. During the first meeting, the councilors elect the Mayor and the Deputy Mayor from amongst themselves. The tenure of Mayor is two and half years and that of his deputy is one year.

History 
The post was created after the Surat Municipal Corporation came into being under the Bombay Provincial Municipal Act, 1949.

Past Mayors 

Surat has witnessed following persons as Mayors.

References

External links 
https://web.archive.org/web/20110502192517/http://www.suratmunicipal.org/content/corporation/mayors.shtml

 
S
Lists of people from Gujarat